The Pines Catholic Camp, located in Big Sandy, Texas outside of Tyler and 2 hours east of Dallas, is a Catholic summer camp and retreat center.  As and accredited camp with the American Camp Association (ACA),  The Pines seeks to continue to “change lives one child at a time.”  Although not affiliated with any dioceses, The Pines has a close relationship with the Roman Catholic diocese of Dallas and follows all of their Safe Environment Guidelines.

Summer Program
Campers are kept busy all day with many different activities. These activities provide the youth with an opportunity to grow in their faith and friendships in an incredible outdoor setting.

Activities
-Swimming
-Arts & Crafts
-Target sports
-Challenge course
-Giant waterslide

Ages: 7-16 
Sessions: Nine separate one-week sessions
A session for campers 7-12
A session for campers 13-16
All other sessions for all ages.

Year Round Program
During the year, The Pines Catholic Camp runs an Environmental Education program, Confirmation Retreats, Spiritual Awakening Programs, Leadership Retreats and Rentals.  The Pines year-round Ministry Staff consists of college graduates who plan, organize and run the retreats.

Camp Activities
Over 25 Catholic Schools from the Dallas Diocese attend Environmental Education where they study Archaeology, Orienteering, Limnology, Entomology, Forestry and Meteorology.  Most groups also participate in activities on the Challenge course which consists of high and low elements and is facilitated by certified staff.  Together the year-round programs serve over 3,500 youth.

History
The Pines Catholic camp was established in 1988.  For six years prior to the founding of the non-profit organization, it operated as an outdoor youth ministry for several Dallas parishes under the direction of co-founder, Executive Director, Bonni Castellaw Brophy and Judi Brophy.  Camp Natowa, a Campfire Girls and Boys property in East Texas, was purchased and in June 1989 the first group of campers entered the gates.  The 446 campers that first summer came from thirty-seven parishes in four dioceses.  Today the summer camp program at The Pines serves over 1700 youth each summer. Hank Lanik, a current Priest in the Diocese of Tyler became the first full-time Camp Director for The Pines Catholic Camp in 1990 and continued as the Camp Director until 2005. John Egan is the current Camp Director on site in Big Sandy, Texas.  The Business Office for The Pines is located in Dallas, Texas

External links
The Pines Catholic Camp Website
The Pines Catholic Camp's ACA page

References

Christian summer camps
Buildings and structures in Upshur County, Texas
1988 establishments in Texas